Arthi Venkatesh is an Indian model and socialite from Chennai. After appearing in commercials and portfolios in the late 2000s, she made her acting debut through Bejoy Nambiar's bilingual film Solo (2017).

Career
Arthi Venkatesh was born in Chennai to a Telugu-speaking family. She graduated with a degree in visual communications from Loyola College, Chennai and pursued a course in interior design from Bangalore. During her time in Bangalore, she became acquainted with fashion stylist Prasad Bidapa, who suggested that she should partake in the Miss India pageant, and subsequently Arthi pursued a career in modelling.

She briefly moved to New York to further her career in fashion. Her first introduction to the international fashion industry took place during the New York Fashion Week, where she was noticed by Jovani and Morrell Maxie and eventually walked for them at the New York Bridal Fashion Week. She is considered as a socialite in Chennai. As of 2017, Arthi has had about 250 runway shows and more than 350 photo shoots to her credit.

Despite receiving acting offers from the likes of Mani Ratnam and Shanoo Sharma of Yash Raj Films, Arthi had been reluctant to enter the film industry early in her career. In 2016, Arthi accepted an acting offer from director Bejoy Nambiar and took up acting training to work on the film. Although the film was shelved, he later offered her a role in Tamil-Malayalam bilingual, Solo (2017) opposite Dulquer Salmaan. She shot for the film for a week in Kochi, and it remains her only acting venture to date. In 2018, she appeared as a judge on the reality show Kadhalika Neramillai alongside Sathish Krishnan.

Personal life
She was married to the Indian cricketer Anirudha Srikkanth.

Filmography

References

External links
 
 

Living people
Female models from Tamil Nadu
Actresses in Malayalam cinema
Actresses from Chennai
Actresses in Tamil cinema
Female models from Chennai
1989 births